This is a list of notable British Azerbaijani people. This includes Azerbaijanii immigrants settled or residing in the United Kingdom and British-born citizens of Azerbaijani ethnic or national origin.

Music
 Jamal Aliyev (born 1993), cellist, born in Baku
 Elyar Fox (born 1995), singer, musician and songwriter 
 Nigar Jamal (born 1980), singer, winner of Eurovision Song Contest 2011
 Sami Yusuf (born 1980), singer-songwriter, multi-instrumentalist, composer, record producer, and humanitarian

Literature 
 Bahman Forsi, Iranian playwright.

Politics
 Hassan Mirza (1899-1943), former Crown Prince of the Qajar dynasty.

Sport 
 Kamal Shalorus (1899-1943), Iranian professional mixed martial artist currently competing in the Lightweight division of ONE FC.
 Jennifer Gadirova (born 2004), British artistic gymnast.
 Jessica Gadirova (born 2004), British artistic gymnast.

See also
 British Azerbaijanis
 List of Azerbaijanis

References

Azerbaijani
Azerbaijani